United Nations Security Council resolution 575, adopted on 17 October 1985, after recalling previous resolutions on the topic, as well as studying the report by the secretary-general on the United Nations Interim Force in Lebanon (UNIFIL) approved in 426 (1978), thec council decided to extend the mandate of UNIFIL for a further six months until 19 April 1986.

The council then reemphasised the mandate of the force and requested the secretary-general to report back on the progress made with regard to the implementation of resolutions 425 (1978) and 426 (1978).

The resolution was adopted by 13 votes to none, with two abstentions from the Ukrainian Soviet Socialist Republic and Soviet Union.

See also 
 Blue Line
 Israeli–Lebanese conflict
 Lebanese Civil War
 List of United Nations Security Council Resolutions 501 to 600 (1982–1987)
 South Lebanon conflict (1982–2000)

References
Text of the Resolution at undocs.org

External links
 

 0575
 0575
Israeli–Lebanese conflict
1985 in Israel
1985 in Lebanon
 0575
October 1985 events